Chester Walker (born February 22, 1940) is an American former professional basketball player.

Born in Bethlehem, Mississippi, Walker played high school basketball for the Benton Harbor High School boys basketball team. He graduated from Bradley University in 1962 as the school's all-time leading scorer. The Bradley Braves won the NIT Championship in 1957 and 1960.  Walker's speed and agility on the court earned him the nickname "Chet the Jet." He probably is best remembered as a starting forward on the 1966–67 Philadelphia 76ers team, which some consider the best NBA team of all time.

NBA career 
Walker was drafted by the Syracuse Nationals in the 1962 NBA draft, and was named to the NBA's first All-Rookie Team in 1963.  He followed the team to Philadelphia after his rookie season.  A seven-time participant in the NBA All-Star Game, Walker averaged over 19 points and eight rebounds a game for the 1966–67 76ers, who won 68 games and lost just 13—the best record in NBA history at the time. That Alex Hannum-coached team, which also featured center Wilt Chamberlain, guards Hal Greer and Wali Jones, and sixth man Billy Cunningham, ended the eight-year championship run of the Boston Celtics. Walker played his final six seasons with the Chicago Bulls, and never averaged less than 19.2 points and 5.0 rebounds a game. In his 13-year career, Walker scored a total of 18,831 points. The 6–6 forward was an outstanding free-throw shooter, especially in his later years with the Bulls. He led the NBA with an accuracy rate of 85.9 percent in 1970–71, and ranked among the top-10 free-throwers five other times.

On February 24, 2012 (two days after Walker's 72nd birthday) it was announced that Chet Walker was elected to the Naismith Memorial Basketball Hall of Fame by the veterans committee. He was formally inducted into the Hall of Fame in Springfield, Massachusetts on September 7, 2012.

Post playing career 
After his playing days, Walker became a moderately successful TV movie producer.  He is the author of a memoir entitled Long Time Coming: A Black Athlete's Coming-of-Age in America (1995).  Walker also appeared in The White Shadow in Season 3's "If Your Number's Up, Get it Down" as a former Chicago Bulls' teammate of Coach Ken Reeves (Ken Howard)

NBA career statistics

Regular season 

|-
| style="text-align:left;"|
| style="text-align:left;"|Syracuse
| 78 || – || 25.5 || .469 || – || .699 || 7.2 || 1.1 || – || – || 12.3
|-
| style="text-align:left;"| 
| style="text-align:left;"|Philadelphia
| 76 || – || 36.5 || .440 || – || .711 || 10.3 || 1.6 || – || – || 17.3
|-
| style="text-align:left;"| 
| style="text-align:left;"|Philadelphia
| 79 || – || 27.7 || .403 || – || .742 || 6.7 || 1.7 || – || – || 13.2
|-
| style="text-align:left;"| 
| style="text-align:left;"|Philadelphia
| 80 || – || 32.5 || .451 || – || .716 || 8.0 || 2.5 || – || – || 15.3
|-
| style="text-align:left;background:#afe6ba;"|  †
| style="text-align:left;"|Philadelphia
| 81 || – || 33.2 || .488 || – || .766 || 8.1 || 2.3 || – || – || 19.3
|-
| style="text-align:left;"| 
| style="text-align:left;"|Philadelphia
| 82 || – || 32.0 || .460 || – || .726 || 7.4 || 1.9 || – || – || 17.9
|-
| style="text-align:left;"| 
| style="text-align:left;"|Philadelphia
| 82 || – || 33.6 || .484 || – || .804 || 7.8 || 1.8 || – || – || 18.0
|-
| style="text-align:left;"| 
| style="text-align:left;"|Chicago
| 78 || – || 34.9 || .477 || – || .850 || 7.7 || 2.5 || – || – || 21.5
|-
| style="text-align:left;"| 
| style="text-align:left;"|Chicago
| 81 || – || 36.1 || .465 || – || .859 || 7.3 || 2.2 || – || – || 22.0
|-
| style="text-align:left;"| 
| style="text-align:left;"|Chicago
| 78 || – || 33.2 || .505 || – || .847 || 6.1 || 2.3 || – || – || 22.0
|-
| style="text-align:left;"| 
| style="text-align:left;"|Chicago
| 79 || – || 31.1 || .478 || – || .832 || 5.0 || 2.3 || – || – || 19.9
|-
| style="text-align:left;"| 
| style="text-align:left;"|Chicago
| 82 || – || 32.5 || .486 || – || .875 || 5.0 || 2.4 || 0.8 || 0.0 || 19.3
|-
| style="text-align:left;"| 
| style="text-align:left;"|Chicago
| 76 || – || 32.3 || .487 || – || .860 || 5.7 || 2.2 || 0.6 || 0.1 || 19.2
|- class="sortbottom"
| style="text-align:center;" colspan="2"| Career
| 1,032 || – || 32.4 || .470 || – || .796 || 7.1 || 2.1 || 0.7 || 0.1 || 18.2
|- class="sortbottom"
| style="text-align:center;" colspan="2"| All-Star
| 7 || 1 || 17.9 || .435 || – || .850 || 2.6 || 1.3 || 0.0 || 0.0 || 8.1

Playoffs 

|-
|style="text-align:left;"|1963
|style="text-align:left;”|Syracuse
|5||–||26.0||.509||–||.733||9.4||1.8||–||–||15.2
|-
|style="text-align:left;"|1964
|style="text-align:left;”|Philadelphia
|5||–||38.0||.390||–||.739||10.4||2.6||–||–||18.8
|-
|style="text-align:left;"|1965
|style="text-align:left;”|Philadelphia
|11||–||42.6||.480||–||.760||7.2||1.6||–||–||20.3
|-
|style="text-align:left;"|1966
|style="text-align:left;”|Philadelphia
|5||–||36.2||.375||–||.806||7.4||3.0||–||–||14.6
|-
| style="text-align:left;background:#afe6ba;"|1967†
|style="text-align:left;”|Philadelphia
|15||–||36.7||.467||–||.807||7.6||2.1||–||–||21.7
|-
|style="text-align:left;"|1968
|style="text-align:left;”|Philadelphia
|13||–||37.3||.410||–||.679||7.4||1.8||–||–||19.1
|-
|style="text-align:left;"|1969
|style="text-align:left;”|Philadelphia
|4||–||27.3||.535||–||.667||5.8||2.0||–||–||13.5
|-
|style="text-align:left;"|1970
|style="text-align:left;”|Chicago
|5||–||35.6||.422||–||.818||8.4||2.2||–||–||19.4
|-
|style="text-align:left;"|1971
|style="text-align:left;”|Chicago
|7||–||33.4||.440||–||.708||7.1||3.1||–||–||15.0
|-
|style="text-align:left;"|1972
|style="text-align:left;”|Chicago
|4||–||24.3||.421||–||.813||3.5||1.0||–||–||11.3
|-
|style="text-align:left;"|1973
|style="text-align:left;”|Chicago
|7||–||32.7||.347||–||.892||8.9||2.0||–||–||16.7
|-
|style="text-align:left;"|1974
|style="text-align:left;”|Chicago
|11||–||36.6||.509||–||.861||5.5||1.6||0.9||0.1||20.9
|-
|style="text-align:left;"|1975
|style="text-align:left;”|Chicago
|13||–||33.2||.494||–||.880||4.6||1.8||1.0||0.1||17.5
|- class="sortbottom"
| style="text-align:center;" colspan="2"| Career
| 105 || – || 35.1 || .449 || – || .787 || 7.0 || 2.0 || 1.0 || 0.1 || 18.2

See also
List of National Basketball Association career free throw scoring leaders

References

External links
Official NBA bio

1940 births
Living people
African-American basketball players
All-American college men's basketball players
American men's basketball players
Basketball players from Michigan
Bradley Braves men's basketball players
Chicago Bulls players
Forwards (basketball)
Naismith Memorial Basketball Hall of Fame inductees
National Basketball Association All-Stars
People from Benton Harbor, Michigan
Philadelphia 76ers players
Syracuse Nationals draft picks
Syracuse Nationals players
21st-century African-American people
20th-century African-American sportspeople